A partial solar eclipse will occur on Sunday, November 4, 2040. A solar eclipse occurs when the Moon passes between Earth and the Sun, thereby totally or partly obscuring the image of the Sun for a viewer on Earth. A partial solar eclipse occurs in the polar regions of the Earth when the center of the Moon's shadow misses the Earth.

Images 
Animated path

Related eclipses

Solar eclipses of 2040–2043

Saros 124

Metonic cycle

References

External links 
 http://eclipse.gsfc.nasa.gov/SEplot/SEplot2001/SE2040Nov04P.GIF

2040 in science
2040 11 4
2040 11 4